Hamilton County Courthouse Square is a historic courthouse and jail located at Noblesville, Hamilton County, Indiana.   The jail was built in 1875–1876, and is a Second Empire style brick and limestone building.  It consists of the two-story, ell-shaped jailer's residence, with a cellblock attached at the rear.  It features a three-story square tower that once had a mansard roof.  The courthouse was built between 1877 and 1879, and is a three-story, Second Empire style, rectangular brick building.  It has a clock tower atop the mansard roof and limestone Corinthian order pilasters.

It was listed on the National Register of Historic Places in 1978. The buildings are also included as contributing buildings in the Noblesville Commercial Historic District, which was NRHP-listed in 1991.

References

Clock towers in Indiana
County courthouses in Indiana
Courthouses on the National Register of Historic Places in Indiana
Government buildings completed in 1879
Second Empire architecture in Indiana
Buildings and structures in Hamilton County, Indiana
National Register of Historic Places in Hamilton County, Indiana
Historic district contributing properties in Indiana